Blackburn with Darwen Borough Council is the local authority of Blackburn with Darwen in Lancashire. It is a unitary authority, having the powers of a non-metropolitan county and district council combined. From 2020 to 2021, the Mayor of Blackburn with Darwen was Iftakhar Hussain of the Labour Party. On 15 February 2021, he resigned after breaching COVID-19 lockdown restrictions.

Former Labour group leader and councillor, Mohammed Khan, was Leader of the Council from May 2015 to May 2022 before his retirement at the 2022 United Kingdom local elections. He served as a borough councillor for 30 years. After the elections, he was replaced as leader by then-Deputy Leader of the Council, Councillor Phil Riley.

Political control

Since becoming a unitary authority in 1998 political control of the council has been held by the following parties:

References

Unitary authority councils of England
Local education authorities in England
Local authorities in Lancashire
Leader and cabinet executives
Billing authorities in England
Local government in Blackburn with Darwen